Chris Martin (born 1977) is the English frontman of Coldplay.

Chris Martin is also the name of:

In sports
Chris Martin (linebacker) (born 1960), American NFL linebacker 
Chris Martin (defensive back) (born 1974), former professional American football defensive back
Chris Martin (offensive lineman) (born 1990), American NFL offensive lineman
Chris Martin (baseball) (born 1986), baseball player
Chris Martin (cricketer) (born 1974), New Zealand cricketer
Chris Martin (footballer, born 1988), Scottish striker for Bristol City
Chris Martin (footballer, born 1990), English goalkeeper for Mickleover Sports
Chris Martin (motorcyclist) (born 1981), British motorcycle racer
Chris Martin (rower) (born 1981), English oarsman
Chris Martin (athlete) (born 1971), Paralympic athlete from Great Britain
Chris Martin, Commissioner of the College Conference of Illinois and Wisconsin

In arts and entertainment
DJ Premier (born 1966), real name Chris Martin, American hip-hop producer
Chris Martin (artist) (born 1954), American painter
Chris William Martin (born 1975), Canadian actor
Chris Martin (Scottish actor), Scottish actor
Chris Martin (comedian) (born 1986), English stand-up comedian and writer
Chris Martin, American vocalist in Hostage Calm

Other
Chris Martin (civil servant) (1973–2015), British civil servant

See also
Christian Martin (disambiguation)
Christy Martin (disambiguation)
Christina Martin (born 1980), comedian
Christopher Martin (disambiguation)
Chris-Pin Martin (1893–1953), American character actor